Kent J. Ingle (born August 6, 1967) is the 15th president of Southeastern University, in Lakeland, Florida.

Early life and education

Ingle was born in Kansas City, Missouri. Because his father was a district manager for American Stores the family moved around the country; first to Illinois, then to Colorado and finally California, which Ingle considers his home  Ingle received his bachelor of arts degree in broadcast journalism and his master's of theological studies from Vanguard University of Southern California in Costa Mesa, California. Ingle later earned a doctor of ministry degree from the Assemblies of God Theological Seminary in Springfield, Missouri.

Career
Ingle was ordained as an Assemblies of God minister in 1988. At the age of 18, Ingle started as a television sports anchor and spent 10 years working for NBC and CBS affiliates. He started his career in Bakersfield, California, and finished his career in Los Angeles, California. During his time as an anchor, he covered many professional sports teams and interviewed hundreds of notable people in the professional sports world, including Michael Jordan, Magic Johnson, Kareem Abdul-Jabbar, Pete Rose, Muhammad Ali and Carl Lewis.

Ingle spent 15 years in pastoral leadership of two congregations - one in northwest Los Angeles and the other in Elgin, Illinois, a suburb of Chicago. Before becoming Southeastern's president in 2011, Ingle served as the dean for the College of Ministry at Northwest University in Kirkland, Washington.

President of Southeastern University

During Ingle’s tenure, SEU expanded enrollment and added to its academic and athletic programs. The university grew from 2,546 students in 2011 to 9,894 students in the 2019-2020 school year, with 112 extension sites and six regional campuses.

In the fall of 2014, SEU launched the first season of Fire football in its newly completed state-of-the-art football stadium. In addition, construction was completed on a new College of Natural & Health Sciences Building.

In 2014 the Southeastern University board of trustees unanimously approved an expansion which included a 32,000-square-foot Welcome Center, a 120,000-square-foot Live/Learn Facility, and an eight-lane track and field facility. The expansion was expected to be completed in 2019.

Ingle is a founding member of the Presidents' Alliance on Immigration and Higher Education.

Publications
Ingle has published four books: This Adventure Called Life: Discovering Your Divine Design, 9 Disciplines of Enduring Leadership , Framework Leadership: Position Yourself for Transformational Change, and The Modern Guide to College.

References

1962 births
Vanguard University alumni
Assemblies of God Theological Seminary alumni
Heads of universities and colleges in the United States
21st-century American non-fiction writers
Living people
American religious writers